Kennet may refer to:

Places in the United Kingdom 
Kennet, Clackmannanshire, Scotland

People 
Baron Kennet, a title in the Peerage of the United Kingdom
D. Mark Kennet (born 1957), American economist
Josh Kennet (born 1987), English-Israeli footballer
Kennet Ahl, pseudonym of Swedish crime novelist duo Lasse Strömstedt and Christer Dahl
Robert Bruce, Lord Kennet (1718–1785), Scottish advocate, legal scholar and judge

Other uses 
 Kennet River (disambiguation)
 River Kennet, Wiltshire and Berkshire, England
 Kennet (district), former local government district in Wiltshire, England
 Kennet (HM Prison), Merseyside, England
 Kennet and Avon Canal, southern England
 Kennet Avenue, prehistoric site in Wiltshire, England
 Kennet Partners, private equity firm based in London, England
Kennet School, school in Thatcham, Berkshire, England
HMS Kennet (1903), destroyer in the Royal Navy
Kennet, a GWR 3031 Class locomotive of the Great Western Railway, England

See also
 Kennett (disambiguation)